Corymbia petalophylla is a species of tree that is endemic to Queensland. It has rough, tessellated bark on the trunk and branches, lance-shaped or curved adult leaves, flower buds in groups of seven, white flowers and barrel-shaped, urn-shaped or shortened spherical fruit.

Description
It has thick, rough, yellowish, tessellated and flaky bark on the trunk and branches, smooth bark only on the thinnest branches. Flowering occurs from July to September and the flowers are white.

Taxonomy and naming
This bloodwood was first formally described in 1991 by Ian Brooker and Anthony Bean who gave it the name Eucalyptus petalophylla and published the description in the journal Austrobaileya. In 1995 Ken Hill and Lawrie Johnson changed the name to Corymbia petalophylla. The specific epithet (petalophylla) is from Greek words meaning "broad" and "leaf", referring to the broad juvenile leaves.

Distribution and habitat
Corymbia petalophylla grows with C. trachyphloia,  C. watsoniana and Eucalyptus baileyana,  in soil derived from granite and occurs in the Burnett district of south-eastern Queensland.

Conservation status
This eucalypt is classified as of "least concern" under the Queensland Government Nature Conservation Act 1992.

See also
 List of Corymbia species

References

petalophylla
Myrtales of Australia
Flora of Queensland
Plants described in 1991